Elkhorn Grove Township is one of twelve townships in Carroll County, Illinois, USA.  As of the 2020 census, its population was 197 and it contained 89 housing units.

Geography

Unincorporated towns
 Elkhorn Grove
 Hazelhurst
 Hitt
 South Elkhorn
(This list is based on USGS data and may include former settlements.)

Cemeteries
The township contains South Elkhorn Methodist Cemetery.

Demographics
As of the 2020 census there were 197 people, 78 households, and 69 families residing in the township. The racial makeup of the township was 96.95% White, 0.51% African American, 0.00% Native American, 0.00% Asian, 0.00% Pacific Islander, 0.00% from other races, and 2.54% from two or more races. Hispanic or Latino of any race were 1.52% of the population.

There were 78 households, out of which 73.10% had children under the age of 18 living with them, 79.49% were married couples living together, 8.97% had a female householder with no spouse present, and 11.54% were non-families. No households were made up of individuals. The average household size was 3.08 and the average family size was 2.94.

The township's age distribution consisted of 32.5% under the age of 18, none from 18 to 24, 17% from 25 to 44, 50.5% from 45 to 64, and none who were 65 years of age or older. The median age was 46.1 years. For every 100 females, there were 175.9 males. For every 100 females age 18 and over, there were 86.2 males.

The median income for a household in the township was $126,786, and the median income for a family was $127,772. Males had a median income of $58,565 versus $56,250 for females. The per capita income for the township was $39,084. No families and 8.3% of the population were below the poverty line.

School districts
 Chadwick-Milledgeville Community Unit School District 399

Political districts
 Illinois' 16th congressional district
 State House District 89
 State Senate District 45

References
 
 United States Census Bureau 2007 TIGER/Line Shapefiles
 United States National Atlas

External links
 City-Data.com
 Illinois State Archives
 Carroll County official site

Townships in Carroll County, Illinois
Townships in Illinois